Freeman's oath may refer to:

 Voter's oath or affirmation, sworn by persons registering to vote for the first time in Vermont
 Oath of a Freeman, required of free immigrants to the Massachusetts Bay colony
 The Freeman's Oath, a 1639 broadsheet printed by British North American Stephen Daye

See also
 Loyalty oath